Judy C. Kany (born June 29, 1937) is an American politician from Maine. Kany, a Democrat from Waterville, Maine, served in Maine House of Representatives (1975-1982) and the Maine Senate (1983-1992). In 1988–89, Kany served as the 44th Mayor of Waterville.

Kany earned a Bachelor of Business Administration from the University of Michigan and a Master of Public Administration from the University of Maine. Besides her time in the Maine Legislature, Kany served as chair of Maine's Advisory Commission on Radioactive Waste (1981–87).

References

1937 births
Living people
University of Maine alumni
Ross School of Business alumni
Mayors of Waterville, Maine
Democratic Party members of the Maine House of Representatives
Democratic Party Maine state senators
Women state legislators in Maine
21st-century American women